Alexander Kabanov may refer to:

Aleksandr Sergeyevich Kabanov (1948–2020) – a Soviet and Russian water polo player and head coach of the Russian water polo team.
Aleksandr Viktorovich Kabanov (born 1962) – a Russian and American chemist.